"Out of Your Shoes" is a song written by Patti Ryan, Jill Wood and Sharon Spivey, and recorded by American country music artist Lorrie Morgan.  It was released in July 1989 as the third single from her album Leave the Light On.  The song reached #2 on the Billboard Hot Country Singles chart in December 1989. It also reached the number one position of the country music charts at Radio & Records.

Chart performance

Year-end charts

References

1989 singles
Lorrie Morgan songs
Song recordings produced by Barry Beckett
RCA Records singles
1989 songs